Poa palustris (fowl bluegrass, fowl meadowgrass, swamp meadowgrass, woodland bluegrass) is a species of grass native to Asia, Europe and Northern America. This plant is used as fodder and forage, and it also used for erosion control or revegetation.

External links
Jepson Manual Treatment
 
USDA Plants Profile: Poa palustris 
Grass Manual Treatment

palustris
Grasses of Asia
Grasses of Europe
Grasses of Canada
Grasses of the United States
Native grasses of the Great Plains region
Native grasses of California
Forages
Plants described in 1759
Taxa named by Carl Linnaeus